Jayson Hale (born June 26, 1985) is an American snowboarder.  He is a two-time Winter X Games bronze medalist (2006, 2012) in snowboard cross. Known for being one of the most technically advanced riders in the sport, Jayson has been a member of the American snowboarding team since (2003) when snowboard cross was officially made an Olympic sport. He was the youngest contender in the sport for some time and is joined by only Seth Wescott and Nate Holland as the remaining original U.S. SBX team members; although it is worthy of note that he is almost 8 years younger than his counterparts.

In addition to his notable achievements in both the FIS World Cup Circuit and the Winter X Games, Jayson is an Olympic Athlete who joined the US Olympic team in 2006 in Turin, Italy. In 2013 Jayson made waves in the Snowboarding World, and solidified his reputation as an all around world-class athlete, when he began venturing outside the traditional Snowboard Cross world he helped build and competed in Backcountry Snowboarding. He placed 3rd in the World FreeRide Championship his first time entering. It is worthy of note that the World FreeRide Championship, hosted by Flow Tailgate Alaska, is a competition known for showcasing the best and most experienced Backcountry Snowboarding athletes in the world who dedicate their lives to understanding the dangers and difficulties of Backcountry riding.

Personal life 
An avid outdoorsman, Jayson has been known to spend his free time in the woods, fly fishing or hunting with his Labrador retriever, Finn, across the United States. He has been involved in a number of non-profit organizations dedicated to ending sexual violence in American communities and schools, working with the Paralympic Snowboard team and disabled veteran. Since his retirement from the US Snowboard Team in 2014, Jayson has earned a BS in Geology/Premed and is now a firefighter/EMT for Truckee Fire.

External links
 
 

1985 births
American male snowboarders
Living people
X Games athletes
20th-century American people
21st-century American people